Ramshastri is a Marathi film. It was released in 1944. The film is  based on the life of Ramshastri Prabhune, the judge who had to decide on Raghoba's culpability in Narayanrao Peshwa's murder. The  Leading Role of Ramshastri Prabhune was played by noted actor Gajanan Jagirdar while the role of Anandibai was played noted actress Lalita Pawar. Supporting role was played by actor Anant Marathe.

References

External links
 

1944 films
1940s Marathi-language films
Prabhat Film Company films
Films set in the Maratha Empire